Didogobius amicuscardis is a species of marine fish in the family Gobiidae, the gobies. The species was named and described by Kovačić and Schliewen in 2008.<ref name = S&K>{{cite journal | author1 = Schliewen, U.K.| author2 = Kovačić, M. | year = 2008 | title = Didogobius amicuscaridis spec. nov. and D. wirtzi spec. nov., two new species of symbiotic gobiid fish from São Tomé and Cape Verde islands (Perciformes, Gobiidae). | journal = Spixiana | volume = 31 | issue = 2 | pages = 247–261}}</ref>

Description

The fish grows to maximum 3.2 cm length. The fish are found in burrows of the shrimp Axiopsis serratifrons; its specific name amicuscaridis'' is a compound noun which means "friend of shrimps" in reference to this association. It feeds on sea snails from the families Scissurellidae, Rissoidae, and Limacinidae.

References 

amicuscaridis
Endemic fauna of São Tomé Island
Fish described in 2008